This is a list in alphabetical order of cricketers who have played for Worcestershire County Cricket Club in top-class matches since 1899 when the club joined the County Championship and the team was elevated to official first-class status. Worcestershire has been classified as a List A team since the beginning of limited overs cricket in 1963 and as a top-level Twenty20 team since the inauguration of the Twenty20 Cup in 2003.

The details are the player's usual name followed by the years in which he was active as a Worcestershire player and then his name is given as it would appear on modern match scorecards. Note that many players represented other top-class teams besides Worcestershire and that some played for the club in minor counties cricket before 1899. Current players are shown as active to the latest season in which they played for the club. The list excludes Second XI and other players who did not play for the club's first team and players whose first team appearances were in minor matches only. The list has been updated to the end of the 2021 cricket season using the data published in Playfair Cricket Annual, 2022 edition.

A

B

C

D

E

F

G

H

I
 Richard Illingworth (1982–2000) : R. K. Illingworth
 Imran Arif (2008–2010) : Imran Arif
 Imran Khan (1971–1976) : Imran Khan
 John Inchmore (1973–1986) : J. D. Inchmore
 Arthur Isaac (1893–1911) : A. W. Isaac
 Herbert Isaac (1919) : H. W. Isaac
 John Isaac (1902–1908) : J. E. V. Isaac
 Derek Isles (1967) : D. Isles

J

K

L

M

N

O
 Leonard Oakley (1935–1948) : L. Oakley
 Richard Oliver (2014–2015) : R. K. Oliver
 Alan Ormrod (1962–1983) : J. A. Ormrod
 Steve O'Shaughnessy (1988–1989) : S. J. O'Shaughnessy
 Laddie Outschoorn (1946–1959) : L. F. Outschoorn

P

Q
 Bernard Quaife (1928–1937) : B. W. Quaife

R

S

T

V
 Chaminda Vaas (2005) : W. P. U. J. C. Vaas
 Lou Vincent (2006) : L. Vincent
 Louis Vorster (1988) : L. P. Vorster

W

Y
 Jim Yardley (1967–1975) : T. J. Yardley
 Hugo Yarnold (1938–1955) : H. Yarnold
 Martin Young (1946–1948) : D. M. Young
 Younis Ahmed (1979–1983) : Younis Ahmed

Z
 Zaheer Khan (2006) : Zaheer Khan

See also
 List of Worcestershire cricket captains

Notes

References

Worcestershire
 
Worcestershire County Cricket Club
Cricket